General Whipple may refer to:

Amiel Weeks Whipple (1817–1863), Union Army brigadier general, and briefly major general
William Whipple (1731–1785), Continental Army brigadier general
William Whipple Jr. (1909–2007), U.S. Army brigadier general